Cutina aluticolor, the leathery cutina moth, is a species of moth in the family Erebidae. It is found in North America.

The MONA or Hodges number for Cutina aluticolor is 8729.1.

References

Further reading

 
 
 

Euclidiini
Articles created by Qbugbot
Moths described in 1998